Vishvas Sarang  is an Indian politician from Madhya Pradesh associated with Bharatiya Janata Party. He is a member of Madhya Pradesh Legislative Assembly from Narela in Bhopal district. He first served as a corporator of the then Bhopal South Vidhansabha constituency from the same Bhartiya Janta Party. He belongs to Kayastha
Hindu community. Sarang  served as the minister for Gas Tragedy Relief and Rehabilitation (Independent Charge) and Panchayat and Rural Development in Madhya Pradesh under chief minister Shivraj Singh Chauhan from 2013 to 2018.

He is an engineering graduate. He started his political career as the corporator of one of the wards of the then Bhopal South Vidhansabha. New constituencies were made in Bhopal in the year 2008, namely Narela, Bhopal Madhya, and Huzur. He got the benefit of being the corporator of Narela, as well as being the son of ex-Rajyasabha MP, Kailash Sarang. Sarang won the seat at the age of 37.

He again contested election against Congress candidate Sunil Sood in 2013, won the seat with increased margin, and became minister in the Shivraj singh chouhan government. Later in 2018, he won the seat against Congress heavyweight, Dr. Mahendra Singh Chouhan.

References

Living people
Madhya Pradesh MLAs 2008–2013
Madhya Pradesh MLAs 2013–2018
Madhya Pradesh MLAs 2018–2023
People from Bhopal
Bharatiya Janata Party politicians from Madhya Pradesh
1971 births